István Dudás (born 12 August 1971) is a Hungarian weightlifter. He competed in the men's middle heavyweight event at the 1992 Summer Olympics.

References

External links
 

1971 births
Living people
Hungarian male weightlifters
Olympic weightlifters of Hungary
Weightlifters at the 1992 Summer Olympics
People from Tatabánya
Sportspeople from Komárom-Esztergom County
20th-century Hungarian people